A Monologue is an extended uninterrupted speech by a character in a drama. It can also refer to:

 Monologue (film), a 1972 Soviet film
 "Monologue", a song by South Korean singer Taemin from the 2019 EP Want
 "Monologue", a song by South Korean singer Tei released in 2022